Nu Mensae, Latinized from ν Mensae, is a solitary star situated in the southern circumpolar constellation Mensa. It has an apparent magnitude of 5.76, making it faintly visible to the naked eye.

Nu Mensae has a stellar classification of F0/2 III, indicating that it is a giant star with a spectrum intermediate between that of an F0 and F2 star.

References

F-type giants
Mensa (constellation)
Mensae, 8
Mensae, Nu
Durchmusterung objects
029116
020297
1456